Boxelder Creek is a stream in Pennington, Meade and Lawrence counties, South Dakota, in the United States. It is a tributary of the Cheyenne River.

Boxelder Creek was named for the box elder growing along its banks.

See also
List of rivers of South Dakota

References

Rivers of Lawrence County, South Dakota
Rivers of Meade County, South Dakota
Rivers of Pennington County, South Dakota
Rivers of South Dakota